Robert Florey (14 September 1900 – 16 May 1979) was a French-American director, screenwriter, film journalist and actor.

Born as Robert Fuchs in Paris, he became an orphan at an early age and was then raised in Switzerland. In 1920 he worked at first as a film journalist, then as an assistant and extra in featurettes from Louis Feuillade. Florey moved to the United States in 1921. As a director, Florey's most productive decades were the 1930s and 1940s, working on relatively low-budget fillers for Paramount and Warner Brothers. His reputation is balanced between his avant-garde expressionist style, most evident in his early career, and his work as a fast, reliable studio-system director called on to finish troubled projects, such as 1939's Hotel Imperial.

Florey directed more than 50 films, the best known likely being the Marx Brothers first feature, The Cocoanuts (1929). His 1932 foray into Universal-style horror, Murders in the Rue Morgue, is regarded by horror fans as highly reflective of German expressionism. In 2006, as his 1937 film Daughter of Shanghai was selected for preservation in the United States National Film Registry by the Library of Congress, Florey was called "widely acclaimed as the best director working in major studio B-films".

Life and work

Early life
Florey grew up in Paris near the studio of George Melies, and as a young man served as assistant to Louis Feuillade.  He was an assistant director on L'orpheline (1921), and Parisette (1921).

Hollywood
Florey went to Hollywood in 1921 as a journalist for Cinemagazine. He worked as foreign publicity director for Douglas Fairbanks and Mary Pickford and was European advance manager for Rudolph Valentino.

He was an assistant director on Parisian Nights (1925). He went to MGM where he was an assistant on The Masked Bride (1925), Exquisite Sinner (1926), Bardelys the Magnificent (1926), La Bohème (1926) and The Magic Flame (1927). He also shot newsreel footage in New York.

Early films
Florey's first film as director was One Hour of Love (1927) for Tiffany Productions. He did The Romantic Age (1927) for Columbia and Face Value (1927) for Stirling Pictures. He was assistant on The Woman Disputed (1928). 

He directed and co-wrote the 27-minute experimental film Johann the Coffinmaker in 1927, said to have been made for $200 in his spare time, shooting at night while working on other films in the daytime. The avant-garde film was made on only three sets, and involved a lot of trick photographic effects.

Shorts
In the late 1920s he produced two experimental short films: The Life and Death of 9413: a Hollywood Extra (1928) co-directed with Slavko Vorkapić, and Skyscraper Symphony the following year. He also directed the shorts Johann the Coffinmaker (1927), The Love of Zero (1928), Hello New York! (1928) with Maurice Chevalier, and Pusher-in-the-Face (1929) from a script and story by F. Scott Fitzgerald published for the first time on the newspaper Woman's Home Companion.

Paramount
Florey accepted a contract to direct at Paramount Pictures, where he made The Hole in the Wall (1929), starring Claudette Colbert and Edward G. Robinson, and The Cocoanuts (1929), the first film of the Marx Brothers.

He directed a short with Fanny Brice, Night Club (1929), and made The Battle of Paris (1929) with Gertrude Lawrence.

Florey went to England to direct a French musical, The Road Is Fine (1930), and to Germany for My Wife's Teacher (1930), a Spanish language version of the film Rendezvous. While in Germany he directed Love Songs (1930). He did Black and White (1931) with Raimu, co-directing with Marc Allegret.

Murders in the Rue Morgue
Florey made a significant but uncredited contribution to the script of the 1931 version of Frankenstein. Florey was to be given the job of directing Frankenstein, and filmed a screen test with Bela Lugosi playing the monster, but Universal Pictures wound up giving the job to James Whale, who cast Boris Karloff. 

Instead Universal assigned Florey and Lugosi to Murders in the Rue Morgue (1932). Florey, with the help of cinematographer Karl Freund and elaborate sets representing 19th century Paris, made Murders into an American version of German expressionist films such as Cabinet of Dr. Caligari (1920).

Florey directed The Man Called Back (1932) with Conrad Nagel for Tiffany Pictures, and Those We Love (1932) with Mary Astor. He wrote the script for a version of A Study in Scarlet  (1933).

Warner Bros.
Florey went to Warner Bros. where he directed a number of "B" movies: Girl Missing (1933) with Glenda Farrell and Ben Lyon, Ex-Lady (1933) with Bette Davis, The House on 56th Street (1933) with Kay Francis, Bedside (1934) with Warren William, Registered Nurse (1934) with Bebe Daniels, Smarty (1934) with Joan Blondell and William, I Sell Anything (1934) with Pat O'Brien,I Am a Thief (1934) with Astor, The Woman in Red (1935) with Barbara Stanwyck, and The Florentine Dagger (1935) with Donald Woods.

He did some uncredited work on Go Into Your Dance (1935) with Al Jolson and Ruby Keeler and was assistant director on I've Got Your Number (1934). He also did some location filming in China for Oil for the Lamps of China (1935).

Florey directed Going Highbrow (1935) with Guy Kibbee, Don't Bet on Blondes (1935) with William (and a young Errol Flynn), and The Payoff (1935) with James Dunn.

Paramount
Florey went to Paramount where he directed Ship Cafe (1935) with Carl Brisson, The Preview Murder Mystery (1936) with Reginald Denny, Till We Meet Again (1936) with Herbert Marshall, Hollywood Boulevard (1936) with John Halliday and a young Robert Cummings, Outcast (1937) with William, King of Gamblers (1937) with Claire Trevor and Lloyd Nolan, Mountain Music (1937) with Bob Burns and Martha Raye, This Way Please (1937) with Charles "Buddy" Rogers and Betty Grable, Daughter of Shanghai (1937) with Anna May Wong, Dangerous to Know (1938) with Wong, and King of Alcatraz (1938) with Gail Patrick and Nolan. He did some uncredited work on Rose of the Rancho (1936). His films were marked by fast pace, cynical tone, Dutch angles, and dramatic lighting.

Florey directed Hotel Imperial (1939) with Isa Miranda and Ray Milland, The Magnificent Fraud (1939) with Akim Tamiroff and Nolan, Death of a Champion (1939) with Lynne Overman, Parole Fixer (1940) from a book by J. Edgar Hoover, and Women Without Names (1940) with Ellen Drew.

Columbia
Florey went to Columbia for The Face Behind the Mask (1941) with Peter Lorre, Meet Boston Blackie (1941) with Chester Morris, and Two in a Taxi (1941) with Anita Louise.

Warner Bros.
Florey went to Warner Bros. for Dangerously They Live (1941) with John Garfield, Lady Gangster (1942) with Faye Emerson and the big budget musical The Desert Song (1943) with Dennis Morgan.

At 20th Century Fox he did some assisting on Bomber's Moon (1943) and directed Roger Touhy, Gangster (1944) with Preston Foster. He went to Republic for Man from Frisco (1944).

In April 1944, he was burned when his car was on fire. Back at Warners Florey directed God Is My Co-Pilot (1945) with Morgan, and Danger Signal (1945) with Emerson and Zachary Scott.

He did some uncredited work on San Antonio (1945) with Errol Flynn and returned to the horror genre with The Beast with Five Fingers (1946).

He was also associate director to Charlie Chaplin on Chaplin's film Monsieur Verdoux (1947).

Freelance director
Florey directed Tarzan and the Mermaids (1948) with Johnny Weissmuller for Sol Lesser in Mexico, and two French Foreign Legion films: Rogues' Regiment (1948) with Dick Powell and Outpost in Morocco (1949) with George Raft.

He did The Crooked Way (1949) with John Payne, The Vicious Years (1950), Johnny One-Eye (1950) with Pat O'Brien, and Charlie's Haunt (1950) with Edgar Bergen then did some uncredited work on Flynn's The Adventure of Captain Fabian (1951).

Television
{{box quote|width=30em|bgcolor=cornsilk|fontsize=100%|salign=center|quote= “Florey was a free spirit who valued his personal liberty within the studio system [but] he never had the commercial clout to make that system work for him...he amused himself with second-string projects and B-picture budgets, relatively minor efforts on which he could word undisturbed, casually inserted a personal touch here and there. His success at this mode of directing made him extremely suitable  for television work, and he enlivened over 300 episodes of series like “Wagon Train”, “The Twilight Zone” and ‘Alfred Hitchcock Presents with his characteristic stylistic flourishes.”—Film historian Richard Koszarski in Hollywood Directors, 1914-1940 (1976). }}

Florey's earliest work for television included The Walt Disney Christmas Show (1951) and Operation Wonderland (1951) for Disney.

He soon devoted himself to television almost exclusively, doing episodes of Your Favorite Story, The Loretta Young Show, Walt Disney's Wonderful World of Color, The Star and the Story, Four Star Playhouse, Ethel Barrymore Theater, Wire Service, Telephone Time, Studio 57, Jane Wyman Presents The Fireside Theatre, General Electric Theater, Schlitz Playhouse, M Squad, Wagon Train,The Restless Gun (the pilot), Goodyear Theatre, Alcoa Theatre, Black Saddle, Westinghouse Desilu Playhouse, The Rough Riders, The David Niven Show, Lock Up, Zane Grey Theater, The Untouchables, The DuPont Show with June Allyson, Markham, The Texan, Checkmate, Michael Shayne, Hong Kong, The Barbara Stanwyck Show, Adventures in Paradise, Thriller, Alcoa Premiere, Alfred Hitchcock Presents, The Dick Powell Theatre, Going My Way, The Great Adventure, The Twilight Zone ("Perchance to Dream", "The Fever", "The Long Morrow") and The Outer Limits.

He also wrote a number of books, including Pola Negri (1927) and Charlie Chaplin (1927), Hollywood d'hier et d'aujord'hui (1948), La Lanterne magique (1966), and Hollywood annee zero (1972).

In 1950, Florey was made a knight in the French Légion d'honneur. 

His 1937 thriller Daughter of Shanghai (1937), starring Anna May Wong, was added to the National Film Registry in 2006.

He was married once from 1928 to 1936 and then a second time to Virginia Florey who lived until 2000. 

He is buried at the Forest Lawn, Hollywood Hills Cemetery in Los Angeles with his second wife.

 Complete filmography 

as an actor
 The Masque of Life(1915-16) Italian

This filmography lists Florey's credits as director of feature films, and is believed to be complete.

 That Model from Paris, 1926 (uncredited)
 One Hour of Love, 1927
 The Romantic Age, 1927
 Face Value, 1927
 The Hole in the Wall, 1929
 The Cocoanuts, 1929
 The Battle of Paris, 1929
 The Road Is Fine (La Route est belle), 1930
 Love Songs (L'Amour chante), 1930
 El Profesor de mi Señora, 1930
 Rendezvous, 1930
 Black and White (Le Blanc et la noir) (co-director), 1931
 Murders in the Rue Morgue, 1932
 The Man Called Back, 1932
 Those We Love, 1932
 Girl Missing, 1933
 Ex-Lady, 1933
 The House on 56th Street, 1933
 Bedside, 1934
 Registered Nurse, 1934
 Smarty, 1934
 I Sell Anything, 1934
 I Am a Thief, 1934
 The Woman in Red, 1935
 The Florentine Dagger, 1935
 Go Into Your Dance (uncredited), 1935
 Going Highbrow, 1935
 Don't Bet on Blondes, 1935
 Ship Cafe, 1935
 The Payoff, 1935
 The Preview Murder Mystery, 1936
 Till We Meet Again, 1936
 Hollywood Boulevard, 1936
 Outcast, 1937
 King of Gamblers, 1937
 Mountain Music, 1937
 This Way Please, 1937
 Daughter of Shanghai, 1937
 Dangerous to Know, 1938
 King of Alcatraz, 1938
 Disbarred, 1939
 Hotel Imperial, 1939
 The Magnificent Fraud, 1939
 Death of a Champion, 1939
 Parole Fixer, 1940
 Women Without Names, 1940
 The Face Behind the Mask, 1941
 Meet Boston Blackie, 1941
 Two in a Taxi, 1941
 Dangerously They Live, 1941
 Lady Gangster (billed as Florian Roberts), 1941
 Bomber's Moon (second-unit director), 1943
 The Desert Song, 1943
 Roger Touhy, Gangster, 1944
 Man from Frisco, 1944
 God Is My Co-Pilot, 1945
 Danger Signal, 1945
 San Antonio, 1945
 The Beast with Five Fingers, 1946
 Tarzan and the Mermaids, 1948
 Rogues' Regiment, 1948
 Outpost in Morocco, 1949
 The Crooked Way, 1949
 The Vicious Years, 1950
 Johnny One-Eye, 1950
 Adventures of Captain Fabian (uncredited), 1951

Short subjects 

 The Love of Zero, 1927
 Hello New York! (aka Bonjour New York), 1928
 The Life and Death of 9413: a Hollywood Extra, 1928
 Skyscraper Symphony, 1929
 Fifty-Fifty, 1932
 "The Incredible Dr. Markesan" Thriller Series, costars Boris Karloff, 1962

Footnotes

References
Koszarski, Richard. 1976. Hollywood Directors: 1914-1940. Oxford University Press. Library of Congress Catalog Number: 76-9262.

External links

Literature on Robert Florey

1900 births
1979 deaths
American film directors
Chevaliers of the Légion d'honneur
Film people from Paris
Burials at Forest Lawn Memorial Park (Hollywood Hills)
French emigrants to the United States